AnyDVD is a device driver for Microsoft Windows which allows decryption of DVDs on the fly, as well as targeted removal of copy preventions and  user operation prohibitions (UOPs). With an upgrade, it will also do the same for HD DVD and Blu-ray Disc. The AnyDVD program runs in the background, making discs unrestricted and region-free. In addition to removing digital restrictions, AnyDVD will also defeat Macrovision analog copy prevention. Analog prevention distorts the video signal to prevent high quality copying from the output. AnyDVD is also able to remove copy-prevention from audio CDs.

The ripper module is based on code from Elby's CloneDVD. Old versions used a ripper based on FixVTS, but FixVTS was shut down by legal threats from Sony in June 2007. As of version 6.1.4.3, AnyDVD has a revised ripper that removes Sony ARccOS Protection, Macrovision RipGuard, and other structural preventions and repairs both intentional and unintentional mastering errors. It ensures strict compliance with third-party tools, particularly DVD Shrink and Nero Recode.

Advanced technical characteristics 
On February 17, 2007, SlySoft released AnyDVD HD. AnyDVD and AnyDVD HD are in fact the same piece of software, but the license key determines whether the HD aspects of the software are available to the user.  When the HD part of the software is enabled it permits access to HD DVDs and Blu-ray Discs, including decryption of AACS encrypted discs. In the case of Blu-ray Discs, it also supports region code removal (HD DVD has no region code).

Besides dealing with DVD copying issues, AnyDVD can also work in the background to automatically detect and remove additional data sessions contained on Audio CDs which contain copy-prevention measures. This allows  audio tracks to be directly accessed on the system for direct playback and for access by CD extraction software. Intentional tracking errors in the audio may also be discovered, for example, those errors involved with key2AudioXS, which may cause major skipping distortions in the ripped audio tracks. By bypassing these methods AnyDVD can provide clean, distortion-free playback and ripping.

On March 19, 2008, SlySoft released version 6.4.0.0 of AnyDVD HD, which removes BD+ as well.  AnyDVD HD has since version 6.4.6.2, August 22, 2008, included the ability to rip movies to an ISO format.

Following the resurrection of AnyDVD (HD) in the Redfox guise, AnyDVD was released in a new version (V8.0.1.0) on 17 May 2016. SlySoft licence keys valid for previous versions (V7.6.9.5 and earlier), including "Free updates until: Forever" keys will not work with the new version. It is necessary to purchase a new licence key from Redfox for the new version (available for 1, 2 and 3 years of support and updates or for 'lifetime'). Previous versions (V7.6.9.1 to V7.6.9.5 inc.) access to the new Redfox Online Protection Database will be blocked from 31 May 2016. There is an implied statement that suggests previous versions may no longer work but it may be that this is only where access to the database is required.

Legal issues 
Advertising, sale, and lending of AnyDVD is outlawed in Germany (but possession is not), as it removes copy prevention from DVDs. The Heise news portal was sued by the record industry for linking to SlySoft's website in a news report. The publisher subsequently counter sued with claims of violation of their constitutionally guaranteed freedom of the press and had, as of April 2007, lost two appeal proceedings. The German Federal Constitutional Court decided not to rule on Heise's appeal for the time being because remedies in the ordinary courts had not been exhausted. In October 2010, the Federal Court of Justice of Germany decided in favor of Heise, a verdict now legally binding. The legal status of AnyDVD in other countries is unclear.

Giancarlo Bettini, the owner of Slysoft, was convicted of 6 counts in an Antigua court under the copyright act of 2003 and ordered to pay $30,000 in restitution. At some point in February 2016 SlySoft shut down, with its home page replaced by a message citing "recent regulatory requirements". However, the company's support forum remained online, with the name SlySoft replaced with "RedFox". SlySoft developers also revealed that none of the company's staff were actually based in Antigua, where SlySoft claimed to have been based, that the company was not involved in legal settlements from AACS LA, and that key staff members still had access to SlySoft's technical infrastructure—including build systems and licensing servers—feasibly allowing development of AnyDVD to continue. This was followed by the release of version 7.6.9.1, which was the first released under the Belize/Latvia-based banner of RedFox.

See also 
 CloneCD
 DVD ripper

References

External links 
 

DVD
DVD rippers